Quelite can mean any of a number of different plants commonly eaten in Mexico for their leaves, as leaf vegetables or herbs, including:

 Amaranthus, species known as Quelite quintonil/quintonilli Amaranthus hybridus, Amaranthus retroflexus, Amaranthus palmeri S. Wats., Amaranthus powellii S. Wats., Amaranthus dubius, Amaranthus spinosus
 Chenopodium, species known as Quelite cenizo, especially Chenopodium album
 Coriandrum, species

See also 
 El Quelite, Sinaloa in Sinaloa